Coconut soup is a fruit soup prepared using coconut milk or coconut fruit as a main ingredient. Many varieties of coconut soups exist in the world, including ginataan, laksa, sayur lodeh, soto, and tom kha kai, and myriad ingredients are used. They can be served hot or cold. While most coconut soups are savoury dishes, some varieties—such as binignit and kolak—are sweet dessert soups.

Overview
Coconut soup is a fruit soup prepared using coconut fruit or coconut milk as a primary ingredient. It can be prepared as a broth-based or cream-based soup. The coconut fruit can be sliced, chopped, or shredded. Green coconut fruit from young coconuts can also be used to prepare coconut soup, and coconut water and coconut oil are sometimes used as ingredients. Many various coconut soups exist in the world, with myriad ingredients used. Coconut soup is sometimes prepared in combinations using other ingredients, such as chicken, potato, or curry. It can be served as a hot or cold soup.

By country and region

Caribbean
Sopito is a common fish soup or fish chowder in Aruba and Curaçao of the Lesser Antilles. The dish uses coconut milk and salt-cured meat as main ingredients. Coconut water is also often used to prepare sopito. Sopita de pisca is a variation that uses tomatoes. Coconut and chayote soup is consumed in some areas of the Caribbean.

China
Sago soup is a Chinese dessert soup prepared using sago starch, which is derived from sago palm pith, coconut milk, and other ingredients. Sago is similar to tapioca, and is produced in pearl form.

Indonesia
Some varieties of soto, an Indonesian soup, are prepared using coconut milk, such as soto ayam and soto betawi. Several Indonesian soups also use coconut milk, such as lontong cap go meh, ketupat sayur, opor and sayur lodeh, a vegetable soup in coconut milk.

Palembang's mie celor is noodles in shrimp and coconut soup, while laksan is slices of pempek fish surimi served in coconut-based laksa soup.

Sweet coconut soup dessert includes kolak and cendol, popular for iftar during Ramadan.

Laos
Tom kha kai is a popular dish in Laos.

Malaysia and Singapore
Laksa is a popular noodle dish with many diverse variants, many of which are prepared with coconut milk, noodles, spices, and meats such as chicken, fish, or shrimp. Tofu and vegetables are also sometimes used as ingredients.

Philippines

In the Philippines, the very diverse class of soups and stews cooked in coconut milk are collectively known as ginataan. They include both savory and dessert dishes. Savory examples of ginataan soups and stews include ginataang kalabasa, sinilihan, and tiyula itum. Dessert examples include binignit, bilo-bilo, and ginataang mais.

Thailand
Thai Khao soi is a noodle soup dish prepared with egg noodles, coconut milk, curry, and meats such as beef and chicken, and served with pickled mustard greens and raw shallots. Red curry is a Thai soup prepared using coconut milk, meats, and red curry as main ingredients. Tom kha kai (Thai coconut soup) is a Thai soup prepared using coconut milk, chicken, mushrooms, chili peppers, galangal, lemongrass, and other ingredients. Tom yam kathi is a Thai coconut soup and a variant of tom yum prepared using coconut milk.

See also

 Asian soups
 Chè bà ba – a Vietnamese dessert that includes coconut milk soup as an ingredient
 List of coconut dishes
 List of dishes made using coconut milk
 List of soups
 Mie koclok – An Indonesian chicken noodle soup that is served in coconut milk soup
 Molagoottal – a South Indian stew prepared using coconut and lentils

Notes

References

External links 
 

Fruit soups
Foods containing coconut